The Archdiocese of Harare (Latin: Archidioecesis Hararensis) is the metropolitan see for the Roman Catholic ecclesiastical province of Harare in Zimbabwe. Its ecclesiastic territory includes the city of Harare, and parts of the provinces of Manicaland, Mashonaland Central, Mashonaland East, and Mashonaland West. The current archbishop is Robert Ndlovu. The mother church of the archdiocese is the Cathedral of the Sacred Heart of Jesus in Harare. The archdiocese has 166 priests, including 56 diocesan priests and 110 religious priests, and 254 religious sisters who are members of various religious institutes as of 2019.  These priests, deacons and persons religious serve the archdiocese's Catholic population in of 3,569,900 in 57 parishes and a number of missions.

History
 July 2, 1879: Established as Mission “sui iuris” of Zambese from the Apostolic Vicariate of Natal in South Africa
 March 9, 1915: Promoted as Apostolic Prefecture of Zambese
 July 14, 1927: Renamed as Apostolic Prefecture of Salisbury 
 March 3, 1931: Promoted as Apostolic Vicariate of Salisbury 
 January 1, 1955: Promoted as Metropolitan Archdiocese of Salisbury
 June 25, 1982: Renamed as Metropolitan Archdiocese of Harare

Special churches
The seat of the archbishop is the Cathedral of the Sacred Heart in Harare.

Prelates

Ordinaries

Superiors of Zambese 
 Henri Depelchin (2 July 1879 – April 1883)
 Richard Sykes (1896–1904)
 Ignatius Gartlan (1904–1911)
 Edward Parry (1911 – 9 March 1915)

Prefects Apostolic of Zambese 
 Richard Sykes (9 March 1915 – December 1919)
 Edward Parry (January 1920 – May 1922)
 Robert Brown (1922 – 14 July 1927 see below)

Prefect Apostolic of Salisbury 
 Robert Brown (see above 14 July 1927 – 1929)

Vicar Apostolic of Salisbury 
 Aston Chichester (4 March 1931 – 1 January 1955 see below)

Archbishops of Salisbury 
 Aston Chichester (see above 1 January 1955 – 23 November 1956)
 Francis William Markall (23 November 1956 – 31 May 1976)
 Patrick Fani Chakaipa (31 May 1976 – 25 June 1982 see below)

Archbishops of Harare 
 Patrick Fani Chakaipa (see above 25 June 1982 – 8 April 2003)
 Robert Ndlovu (10 June 2004 – )

Coadjutor archbishop
Francis William Markall (1956)

Auxiliary bishop
Patrick Fani Chakaipa (1972–1976)

Suffragan dioceses
 Chinhoyi
 Gokwe
 Mutare

See also
Catholic Church in Zimbabwe
List of Catholic dioceses in Zimbabwe
List of parishes in the Archdiocese of Harare

External links

Sources
 catholic-hierarchy
 GCatholic.org

Harare
Harare
A